Bicyclus xeneas, the stately bush brown, is a butterfly in the family Nymphalidae. It is found in Guinea, Sierra Leone, Ivory Coast, Ghana, Togo, Benin, Nigeria, Cameroon, Equatorial Guinea, Gabon, the Republic of the Congo and the Democratic Republic of the Congo. The habitat consists of forests.

Subspecies
Bicyclus xeneas xeneas (Nigeria, Cameroon, Bioko, Gabon, Congo, Democratic Republic of the Congo)
Bicyclus xeneas occidentalis Condamin, 1965 (Guinea, Sierra Leone, Ivory Coast, Ghana, Togo, Benin, western and southern Nigeria)

References

Elymniini
Butterflies described in 1866
Butterflies of Africa
Taxa named by William Chapman Hewitson